Rizvan Yaralyyevich Sadayev (born 26 August 1979) is a former Russian football player.

References

1979 births
Living people
Russian footballers
FC Angusht Nazran players
FC Akhmat Grozny players
Russian Premier League players
Association football midfielders
FC Mashuk-KMV Pyatigorsk players